Hoshiimo is a sweet potato snack popular in Japan similar to a number of other dried foods in Asia.
This food generally consists of steamed, dried, sweet potatoes that are skinned and sliced with no artificial sweeteners added. 
In some cases, the sweet potatoes may be roasted rather than steamed. The surface may be covered with a white powder.
Not to be mistaken for mold, this is a form of crystallized sugar that emerges as the sweet potatoes dry.
With a chewy texture and sweet potato flavor, this food can be eaten raw or roasted.
This dish is particularly rich in vitamins A, B1, C, and E and contains much potassium and calcium 
as well as dietary fiber. As an alkaline food, reputedly it helps the body maintain a healthy pH balance.

This product goes by other names in Japan such as  'kanso-imo', 'mushi-kirihoshi', and 'kiriboshi kansho'. 
It is similar to two Korean dishes:  "goguma-malaengi"  and  "mallingoguma".
The latter is  cut into thinner slices and has a crisper texture than the former.
In China a snack very similar to hoshiimo known as "dìguā gàn" is popular and in Vietnam a product known as "khoai lang sấy dẻo" is common.

Varieties in Japan

In Japan hoshiimo is available in many shapes ranging from French fry-like rods to broad, flat chunks roughly 10–15 cm in 
length and 5 cm in width. Sometimes oblong, unsliced varieties, known as "maru-boshi"  are also marketed. 

Many types of sweet potato (Ipomoea batatas) are used to make this product.
Common varieties include Beniharu, Tamayutaka, Silk Sweet, 
and Anno-Mitsuki sweet potatoes.  Since China ranks above Japan in terms of sweet potato production and the price of sweet potatoes in China is generally lower than in Japan, much of the hoshiimo sold in Japan today is, in fact, produced in China.

History

This product supposedly originated in Omaezaki City in what today is Shizuoka Prefecture. Around 1824 a merchant named Shozo Kuribayashi began in manufacturing this dish on a small scale.  In 1892, Rinzo Ohniwa and Jinhichi Inagaki of modified the manufacturing  process to facilitate industrial production.
Soon this product spread throughout Japan as a popular type of preserved food. It was also used during the Russo-Japanese War,  briefly gaining the sobriquet as "soldier's potatoes."
In 1908 large scale production began in Ibaraki prefecture.  Two theories exist about how this product was introduced to Ibaraki prefecture. One theory holds that a rice cracker maker named Toshichi Yuasa hired a technician who modified his dried seafood processing facility  to produce this agricultural product.
Another theory holds that Seiji Koike and Jizan Ouchi got the backing of the governor of Ibaraki Prefecture, Masataka Mori, to start up local production with the aid of two technicians from Shizuoka.

Both public and private sectors in Ibaraki Prefecture have promoted steamed dried sweet potatoes extensively.  In 2019 the Hitachinaka Chamber of Commerce and Industry was selected by the Japan Chamber of Commerce and Industry as the winner of a commerce prize for its "Dried Sweet Potato Attraction Project" that included the development of hoshiimo cakes 
and a book outlining the history of dried sweet potatoes.
Today over 80% of the steamed dried sweet potatoes sold in Japan are from Ibaraki prefecture.

See also
 List of sweet potato dishes

References 

Chinese cuisine
Japanese cuisine
Sweet potatoes
Dried foods